Hellsten or Hellstén is a Swedish surname that may refer to

Johan Hellsten (born 1975), Swedish chess grandmaster
Milja Hellsten (born 1990), Finnish curler
 Nils Hellsten (fencer) (1886–1962), Swedish fencer
 Nils Hellsten (gymnast) (1885–1963), Swedish gymnast
Voitto Hellstén (1932–1998), Finnish sprinter

Swedish-language surnames